The 1978 California Secretary of State election was held on November 7, 1978. Democratic incumbent March Fong Eu defeated Republican nominee Jacob "Jay" Margosian with 62.49% of the vote.

General election

Candidates
Major party candidates
March Fong Eu, Democratic
Jacob "Jay" Margosian, Republican

Other candidates
David Wald, Peace and Freedom
Valerie C. Seeman, American Independent

Results

References

1978
Secretary of State
California